Needs are things considered, or perceived as being, necessary.

Needs may refer to:

Arts and entertainment
 "Needs", the eighth episode of the television series Dollhouse

Songs
 "Needs", by Collective Soul from the 1999 album Dosage
 "Needs", by Justin Martin, 2020
 "Needs", by Mia Wray, 2021
 "Needs", by Verzache, 2018

People and places
 James Needs (1919–2003), a British film editor
 Needs Convenience, a Canadian convenience store

Other uses
 Maslow's hierarchy of needs, an idea in psychology proposed by Abraham Maslow

See also
 "Wants and Needs", a 2021 song by Drake and Lil Baby
 Need (disambiguation)
 Needy (disambiguation)